Epermenia pulchokicola is a moth in the family Epermeniidae. It was described by Reinhard Gaedike in 2010. It is found in Nepal.

References

Moths described in 2010
Epermeniidae
Moths of Asia